is a Japanese former actress. Her acting career began in early 2001, when she was cast for the lead role in the movie Platonic Sex among 12,083 applicants. Now she is probably best known for roles in various TV Dramas and tokusatsu shows such as Ultraseven X and Kamen Rider Kiva. She was represented by Watanabe Entertainment. In July 2011 she retired from show business, citing stress and a desire to resume a normal life as reasons for her decision.

Filmography

Television
Kamen Rider Kiva (TV Asahi, 2008) as Maya/Queen/Pearlshell Fangire (1986 Timeline)
Keishicho Sosa Ikka 9 Gakari 3 (TV Asahi, 2008) as Natsuki
Mikon Six Sisters 2 (CBC/TBS, 2008) as Hitoshi Atsushi (6th sister)
Ultraseven X (CBC/TBS, 2007) as Saeki Elea
Keishicho Sosa Ikka 9 Gakari 2 (TV Asahi, 2007) as Natsuki
Mikon Six Sisters (CBC/TBS, 2006) as Hitoshi Atsushi (6th sister)
Shin Ningen Kosaten (NHK, 2006) as a bad girl
Kekkon Dekinai Otoko (Fuji TV, 2006, ep4) as a guest in ep. 4
Oniyome Nikki (Fuji TV, 2005) as Nakagawa Yuki
Daisuki! Itsutsugo (TBS, 2004) as Nakagawa Kaori
Fantasma - Noroi no Yakata (TV Tokyo, 2004) as Asakura Yuka
Hagure Keiji Junjoha (TV Asahi, 2003)
Kyohansha (NTV, 2003)
Dobutsu no Oisha-san (TV Asahi, 2003) as Shimada Sayo
Sky High (TV Asahi, 2003) as a guest in ep. 2
Tokyo Niwatsuki Ikkodate (NTV, 2002)

Films
Girls life's (2009) as Miki
Tenshi no Koi (2009) as Naoko
Prisoner No. 07: Reina (JOSHÛ: 07-GÔ REINA) (2006)
Ori Nyosho Reika Shukan (2006)
Satsujinbachi - kirâ bî (Killer Bee) (2005)
Platonic Sex (2001) as Kadokura Aoi

Discography
"Rainy Rose (Queen Edit.)" as Maya/Queen/Pearlshell Fangire (1986 Timeline), 2009

External links
Official profile
Personal blog 
Kagami Saki's Poetry Blog

References

1985 births
Living people
Japanese actresses
Japanese idols
Japanese female models